Meteorological Service of New Zealand Limited (MetService) is the national meteorological service of New Zealand. MetService was established as a state-owned enterprise in 1992. It employs about 300 staff, and its headquarters are in Wellington, New Zealand. Prior to becoming a state-owned enterprise, New Zealand's national meteorological service has existed in a number of forms since the appointment of the country's first Director of Meteorological Stations in August 1861.

As New Zealand's national meteorological service, MetService produces and issues forecasts and official weather warnings on behalf of New Zealand's Ministry of Transport and is certified by the Civil Aviation Authority of New Zealand.

International media, aviation and energy business is conducted under the MetraWeather brand.

MetService has been certified to the ISO 9001 standard since November 1995.

History
The weather forecasting service began in 1861, when a spate of shipwrecks prompted the Government to start a storm warning service as part of the then Marine Department.

Forecasting remained a marine service until 1926, when it became part of the newly formed Department of Scientific and Industrial Research. In 1927 Edward Kidson was appointed Dominion Meteorologist by Earnest Marsden. At the time the New Zealand Meteorological Service was a very small institution with a staff of five and a complete lack of useful long-period meteorological records.

At the outbreak of World War Two in 1939, forecasting became part of the Royal New Zealand Air Force. The focus on aviation continued with a move in 1964 to the then Department of Civil Aviation, which in 1968 became part of a new "super ministry", the Ministry of Transport.

During the 1980s there was increasing pressure on government funding for meteorology in New Zealand, together with a government-wide move to "user-pays" for specialised services, and to more autonomy and accountability for government departments. A combination of commercial competition in the deregulated market for meteorological services and reform of publicly funded science led to the establishment of MetService as a state-owned enterprise on 1 July 1992.

In 2013, MetService invested in a 49% shareholding in MetOcean Solutions Limited, a New Zealand oceanographic services company. MetOcean was an established company specialising in oceanographic analysis for research and forecasting for many purposes, including ports, offshore oil & gas industries and surfers.

In early September 2020, MetService's website came under a wave of distributed denial of service attacks that also targeted the New Zealand Exchange, Stuff, Radio New Zealand and Westpac bank.

World Meteorological Organization
The world's national meteorological and hydrological services work with the World Meteorological Organization (WMO), a specialised agency of the United Nations. As part of the WMO World Weather Watch, MetService sends observational data gathered from the New Zealand region to other WMO member countries around the world. This is used as input to computer models of the weather at the world's major numerical weather prediction centres.

MetService operates a data collection network within New Zealand. It complies with recognised international standards as prescribed by the WMO over and around New Zealand. In particular, data are collected through:
 Surface observations over New Zealand
 Upper air observations using a variety of means ground-based equipment, aircraft, weather radars
 Voluntary observing ships
 A network of drifting buoys in the Tasman Sea.

Norm Henry, General Manager of Science and Strategy, is the current permanent representative of New Zealand with the WMO.

Weather forecasts for New Zealand
Forecasts and warnings funded by the New Zealand government include:
 Land:
Basic public and mountain forecasts
Warnings of hazardous weather affecting land areas
 Marine:
Warnings of gales, storms and hurricanes for New Zealand's marine area of responsibility, METAREA XIV
Synopses and forecasts for New Zealand's marine area of responsibility, METAREA XIV
Warnings and forecasts for coastal waters
Aviation (ICAO services):
Meteorological Watch Office (MWO)
Volcanic Ash Advisory Centre (VAAC)
OPMET data.

MetraWeather
MetraWeather (Australia) Pty Ltd, MetraWeather (UK) Ltd and MetraWeather‌ (Thailand)‌ Ltd are wholly owned subsidiaries of Meteorological Service of New Zealand Limited, providing weather intelligence and information presentation products and services globally under the MetraWeather brand to:
 Port and harbour managers and offshore oil & gas operators
 Transport and related infrastructure operations, including aviation, roading and rail
 Energy generators (combined cycle gas turbine operators, hydro power operators and wind farm operators), retailers and network managers
 Broadcast and interactive media, via the Weatherscape XT weather presentation system
 Retailers and logistics managers

The Pacific
MetService maintains close links with the meteorological agencies of various Pacific Island states.

All warnings of hazardous weather for the South Pacific region, normally received from the Regional Specialized Meteorological Center in Nadi, Fiji, are forwarded to Radio New Zealand International and to the Ministry of Foreign Affairs and Trade.

MetService provides backup for the main warning and forecasting responsibilities of the Regional Specialized Meteorological Center in Nadi, Fiji, should that centre temporarily shut down or be cut off, possibly due to a direct hit by a cyclone. They also take over Primary warning responsibility should a cyclone move to the south of 25S.

Numerical weather prediction
The cooperative relationship among the world's national meteorological services enables the sharing of much weather information, including the output from global numerical weather prediction (NWP) models. Meteorologists at MetService routinely use information from the world's major modelling centres for day-to-day production of forecasts and weather warnings.

The global models that MetService uses generally provide reliable forecasts of weather features, like highs and lows, over forecast periods of several days; however, they are less effective at predicting small-scale weather features like sea breezes and localised showers. Such features are often strongly affected by the local geography, which tends to be poorly represented in the global models.

An effective way of dealing with this problem is to use another type of NWP model known as a limited-area model. MetService routinely runs a number of limited-area models based on both MM5 and WRF with lateral boundary conditions provided by each of the available global models. The
primary model configuration for regional forecasting in New Zealand has a horizontal spacing between grid points of 12 km, which allows weather features down to about 50 km wide to be represented (highs and lows are thousands of kilometres wide). This domain is nested within a much larger domain of 60 km grid spacing, which enables the weather to be modelled over quite a large geographical area for reasonable computational cost.

Competition with NIWA
MetService and NIWA are both government organizations that produce weather forecasts. In 2009, they signed a memorandum of understanding to work more closely together. In 2020, MetService chief executive Peter Lennox told Parliament that they have more weather models and meteorologists  and produce more detailed forecast than NIWA. Private weather forecaster WeatherWatch commented that it is "bizarre" the government is funding two weather forecasters and compared it to "Fire Service getting into Police Speeding Infringements".

See also
[[{{#ifexpr:>6|–|–}} South Pacific cyclone season]]
Climate of New Zealand

References
De Lisle, John Felix. Sails to satellites: a history of meteorology in New Zealand. History of the New Zealand Meteorological Service from its inception through to 1985, written by a former Director. While published by the then New Zealand Meteorological Service, the author states in the Preface that "The Service, which sponsored this book, has had no influence upon the interpretation of historical events, or the judgements made." New Zealand Meteorological Service, 1986.

External links
 MetService - Te Ratonga Tirorangi
 MetraWeather

1992 establishments in New Zealand
Government-owned companies of New Zealand
New Zealand
Climate of New Zealand